The Statue of Flora in Szczecin is a baroque monument to Flora, a goddess of flowers and spring, located at White Eagle Square (Polish: Plac Orła Białego) in Szczecin (the Old Town). The statue was made of sandstone around 1730 by German sculptor Johann Georg Glume to a design by Johann Konrad Koch. The sculpture group consists of Flora holding a basket of flowers, along with a putto on either side: one climbing on a horn of plenty; one sitting by another basket of flowers. It was destroyed during the Second World War and restored in 1953.

References

Sculptures in Szczecin
Baroque sculptures
1730s sculptures
Outdoor sculptures in Poland